Crossing Boundaries is an annual summer radio documentary series on CBC Radio One.

Each year, the producers select a number of recent acclaimed documentaries produced by various international public radio networks and broadcasts one per week.

External links
CBC Radio

CBC Radio One programs
Canadian documentary radio programs